Rafael Hernández (3 August 1928 – 7 November 1997) was a Spanish film actor. He appeared in some 200 films between 1956 and 1990. He was born and died in Madrid, Spain.

Selected filmography

 The Mustard Grain (1962)
 The Fair of the Dove (1963)
 Brandy (1964)
 El mejor tesoro (1966)
 Canadian Wilderness (1965)
 The Last Tomahawk (1965)
Forty Degrees in the Shade (1967)
 Another's Wife (1967)
 A Decent Adultery  (1969)
 Blood in the Bullring  (1969)
 The Man Who Wanted to Kill Himself (1970)
 Una chica casi decente (1971)
 Murders in the Rue Morgue (1971)
 Nothing Less Than a Real Man (1972)
 The Cannibal Man (1972)
 The Dominici Affair (1973)
 The Marriage Revolution (1974)
 Dick Turpin (1974)
 Naked Therapy (1975)
 Death's Newlyweds (1975)
 The Legion Like Women (1976)
 May I Borrow Your Girl Tonight? (1978)
 Father Cami's Wedding (1979)
 Spoiled Children (1980)
 And in the Third Year, He Rose Again (1980)
 La colmena (1982)
 The Autonomines (1984)

External links

1928 births
1997 deaths
Spanish male film actors
Male actors from Madrid
20th-century Spanish male actors